Salaya railway station is a railway station located in Salaya Subdistrict, Phutthamonthon District, Nakhon Pathom Province and is a class 1 railway station. Salaya railway station is close to Mahidol University and Mahidol Witthayanusorn School and therefore the station also serves these two institutes.

Train services 
Service Daily
 Special Express 31/32 : Bangkok–Hat Yai Junction–Bangkok
 Special Express 37/38 : Bangkok–Sungai Kolok–Bangkok
 Special Express 39/40 : Bangkok–Surat Thani–Bangkok
 Special Express 41/42 : Bangkok–Yala–Bangkok  (No service while in COVID-19)
 Special Express 43/44 : Bangkok–Surat Thani–Bangkok
 Special Express 45/46 : Bangkok–Padang Besar–Bangkok  (No service while in COVID-19)
 Express 83/84 : Bangkok–Trang–Bangkok
 Express 85/86 : Bangkok–Nakhon Si Thammarat–Bangkok
 Rapid 167/168 : Bangkok–Kantang–Bangkok
 Rapid 169/170 : Bangkok–Yala–Bangkok  (No service while in COVID-19)
 Rapid 171/172 : Bangkok–Sungai Kolok–Bangkok
 Rapid 173/174 : Bangkok–Nakhon Si Thammarat–Bangkok  (No service while in COVID-19)
 Ordinary : 251/252 Thonburi–Prachuap Khiri Khan–Thonburi
 Ordinary : 254/255 Lang Suan–Thon Buri–Lang Suan
 Ordinary : 257/258 Thon Buri–Nam Tok–Thon Buri
 Ordinary : 259/260 Thon Buri–Nam Tok–Thon Buri
 Ordinary : 261/262 Bangkok–Hua Hin-Bangkok
 Ordinary : 351/352 Thon Buri–Ratchaburi–Thon Buri
 Commuter : 355/356 Bangkok–Suphan Buri–Bangkok
 Commuter : 471/472 Thon Buri–Salaya–Thon Buri
 Commuter : 473/474 Thon Buri–Salaya–Thon Buri
 Commuter : 475/476 Thon Buri–Salaya–Thon Buri
 Commuter : 477/478 Thon Buri–Salaya–Thon Buri
 Commuter : 479/480 Thon Buri–Salaya–Thon Buri

Service Only Workday
 Commuter : 355(1)/356(1) Thon Buri–Salaya–Bang Sue Junction
 Commuter : 355(2)/356(2) Bang Sue Junction–Salaya–Thon Buri

Service Only Holiday
 Excursion : 909/910 Bangkok–Nam Tok–Bangkok
 Excursion : 911/912 Bangkok–Hua Hin–Bangkok

References 

 
 
 

Railway stations in Thailand